Live Bootleg is the first live album by American Christian rock band Audio Adrenaline, released on ForeFront Records on October 10, 1995. It contains live recordings of songs from the band's self-titled 1992 debut album and Don't Censor Me (1993), as well as an intro and a cover of "If You're Happy and You Know It". The album was recorded at concerts in Nevada, New Jersey, Oregon, Pennsylvania, and Washington in autumn 1994.

Reception

Live Bootleg received mixed reviews from critics. Most of them recommended it only to established fans of the band. David Denis, of Jesus Freak Hideout, gave the album 2.5 stars out of 5, writing that the album "does not hold up against their studio work. Most of the time, it feels underproduced, which in a way, constitutes the 'bootleg' feel of the album." John DiBiase, on the other hand, writes that the album "captures their live energy pretty well with its raw production and intimate presentation".

Track listing

Personnel
Audio Adrenaline
Mark Stuart – lead vocals
Bob Herdman – keyboards, vocals
Will McGinniss – bass guitar, vocals
Barry Blair – lead guitars, vocals

Additional musician
Brian Hayes – drums

Production
Audio Adrenaline – production
Chris Michaelessi – engineering
Louis Deluca – photography
Chuck Hargett, Kerri Stuart – art

Notes
1. Mistitled "Can't Take God" on the back of the CD insert.

2. Mistitled "Bighouse" on the back of the CD insert.

3. Titled "Happy and You Know It" on the back of the CD insert.

References

Audio Adrenaline albums
1995 live albums
ForeFront Records live albums